Vitor Eudes de Souza Costa (born 21 October 1998), commonly known as Vitor Eudes, is a Brazilian footballer who currently plays as a goalkeeper for Fluminense.

Career statistics

References

1998 births
Living people
Brazilian footballers
Association football goalkeepers
Cruzeiro Esporte Clube players
Brazilian expatriate footballers
Brazilian expatriates in Portugal
Expatriate footballers in Portugal